Lejamaní is one of the 21 municipalities in the Honduran department of Comayagua.

History 
The municipality began as a town entrusted to Don Felipe II, King of Spain in 1630.

References 

Municipalities of the Comayagua Department